Enter the Phoenix (Chinese: 大佬愛美麗, Daai lo oi mei lai, literally "Big brother loves beauty") is a 2004 Hong Kong film directed by Stephen Fung.

Plot
When gang master Hung died, his two followers Cheung and Chapman To were sent to Thailand to look for his son, Georgie Hung, to succeed him. Georgie, who is gay and lives as a cook with his boyfriend Frankie, is uninterested to continue his father's work. But his close friend Sam, adored the life of a gangster and took his position instead. Sam and Georgie thus returned to Hong Kong with their identities swapped.

Upon returning, they discovered that Hung had accidentally killed Cheng Chow's father and now Cheng Chow, a leading gangster of a friendly gang, led by Chan Wai-Man, is looking to avenge for his father's death.

Meanwhile, Chan Wai-Man wanted to let his daughter Julie to marry Sam in order to strengthen the bond between the two gangs. Sam initially agrees but later changed his mind when he discovered that Julie is not in love with him.

Finally, Cheng Chow kidnapped both Julie and Sam and forced Georgie to lead his gang on a rescue mission. Georgie, with help from Julie and Sam, defeated Cheng Chow in the final battle and told him to accept the fact that his father's death was an accident. Then Cheng Chow saved Georgie when one of his men tried to take his life.

Julie and Sam fell in love during the kidnapping and decided to get married while Sam and Georgie took joint leadership of the gang.

Full cast
 Eason Chan - Sam
 Daniel Wu - Georgie Hung Chi Kit
 Karen Mok - Julie Lui
 Chapman To - Chapman To
 Law Kar-ying - Master 8 / Cheung / Father Fight
 Stephen Fung - Cheng Chow
 Yuen Biao - Georgie Hung's father
 Nicholas Tse - Cock Head
 Jackie Chan - Mr. Chan / Client of Julie (cameo)
 Brian Lee - David
 Michael Chan - Lui the Gang leader
 Philip Ng - Bo
 Chapman To - Kin
 Sam Lee - Gay Man
 Sammi Cheng - Head Restaurant Manager (cameo)
 Hayama Go - Max Cheung (Chow's Henchman)
 Chan Wai-Man - Lui
 Lee Lik-Chi - Ma Leung
 Glen Chin - Fat Ox
 Maggie Lau - Breeze
 Koey Wong - Precious
 Tenky Kai Man Tin - Assassin
 Courtney Wu - Mr. Ho
 Ankee Leung - Kin's thug
 Sam Hoh - Chow's thug
 Chu Cho-Kuen (extra)

See also
Jackie Chan filmography

External links 
 
 

2004 films
2000s Cantonese-language films
Hong Kong LGBT-related films
Films directed by Stephen Fung
2004 directorial debut films
2004 LGBT-related films
2000s Hong Kong films